Kora Jahanabad is a town in Fatehpur district and in Indian state of Uttar Pradesh. It is located on Kora Road, about 6 km east of Jahanabad, about 43 km south of Kanpur, 78 km west by northwest of Fatehpur, and 480 km southeast of Delhi. Local people also call it "Jahanabad".

Economy
It has many banks, such as Baroda UP Gramin Bank, State Bank of India, Bank of Baroda, Central Bank of India, Cooperative Bank, ATMs, all two wheelers showrooms and service centres. Post office is situated in the town with its services. Buses go to Kanpur in every 45 minutes. It has a big power house, water tanks and petrol pumps to full fill all the requirements of the residents. City is endowed with a bus stand of UPSRTC, which connect it to near by places and also to big cities like Auraiya, Etawah, Kanpur, Lucknow, Delhi etc. The roadways bus service is for 24 hours. Buses comes from Fatehpur depot, Auraiya depot, Etawah depot, Kidwainagar depot etc.

Demographics & Politics 
Kora Jahanabad is the consistency in Fatehpur district. As of 2011 India census, Kora Jahanabad had a population of 26,359 out of which males were 13,898 and females were 12,461.The average literacy rate was 72.44%, lower than the national average of 74.04%: male literacy is 78.32%, and female literacy is 65.93%. The sex ratio was 897 women per every 1000 men. Also as per Census , the Child Sex Ratio was 864. Kora Jahanabad has a Municipal Body Called Nagar Panchayat Kora Jahanabad. The First Chairman or Nagar Panchayat President was Swargiya Satyadev Gupta. Swargiya Satyadev Gupta was also a Social Worker Belongs from Landlord and Powerful Political Family Of Jahanabad. So, Many Social Works Done By him and Many Lands Are Also Donated By him Such As Town Area Or Nagar Panchayat Land, Power House Land, Ram Leela Maidan, and Many more Lands. In 1952, First, Member Of Legislative Assembly or MLA or Vidhayak Of Jahanabad is Contested Election By the Support Of Swargiya Satyapal Gupta Lamabardar and All Financial Expenses and Muscle Power Of Election are Picked up By Him. Satyapal Gupta [Lambardar] Was Also a Social Worker and has Donated Many Lands Such As in Bhoodan Andolan he Donated 40 Acres Land Near Khajua , Arya Samaj Temple Land in Jahanabad, Adarsh Inter College Land in Jahanabad, Balika Vidhyalaya Land in Jahanabad. He is Also a Founder of Adarsh Inter College, Jahanabad. Swargiya Satyapal Gupta [Lambardar] and Swargiya Satyadev Gupta [Ex-Chairman] is Very Famous Personality.His Name and Fame is Spread Over Many Districts of Central Uttar Pradesh. About All Ministers, MP's & MLA's are Keeps on Coming. This Landlord Family Has Also a Big and Famous Hindu Temple Called Ram Janki Dham or Ram Talai Mandir in Jahanabad. Currently, Mr. Mukul Gupta is the Sarvakaar of Ram Janki Dham or Ram Talai Mandir. Currently, Smt. Rabiya Khatoon is Chairman of Nagar Panchayat Kora Jahanabad.

Academics 
The town consists many government and private educational institutes. Some of them are
 Shri Addya Saran Singh Adarsh Inter College
 Gandhi Inter College
 Vikas Vidya Mandir
 National High School
 Dilip Kumar Smarak Mahavidyalay
 Vivekanand Vikas Sansthan
 Children Public School
 Children haven school baradari
 Gyandeep School
 Royal Guest House & Schools
 Bhola Nath Uttam Degree College
 Maujilal Mahavidyalaya
 Saraswati Shishu Mandir
 Saraswati Vidya Mandir
 Government Balika Vidyalaya
 KanyaVidya Pathshala
 Jabariya School
 Dayanand Saraswati School
 Shahid Malta Sports School
 Madarsa
 Sanskrit Pathshala(Closed-1998)

Hospitals 
 Samudaik Swasthya Kendra in Garhi kora
 Private Hospital on The Mugal Road
 S.J.Hospital & Diagnostics(An ISO 9001-2015 Certified Hospital)
 Surya Hospital
 Rajkiya Homeopathic Hospital near chowk.

Points of interest 
It has a One of the Biggest and Famous Hindu Temple of Fatehpur District Called "Ram Janki Dham Or Ram Talai Mandir". In this Temple lot of Events are Organised every year Under the Guidance and Care of Temple Sarvakaar Mr. Mukul Gupta and Mandir Main Priest Or Mukhya Pujari Awadesh Baba Ji. Every Year 
in this Temple, Big Dangal Event "Mahavir Ji Ka Inami Dangal" is Organised by Prestigious & Landlord Gupta Family in the Remembrance Of "Swargiya Satyapal Gupta [Lambardar] & Swargiya Satyadev Gupta [Ex- Chairman]. The Dangal Event was Started By Swargiya Satyapal Gupta [Lambardar] as he Loves Kusti & Pehlwani. It has a Hindu temple dedicated to Ambika and a masjid.

References

Cities and towns in Fatehpur district